Heart of the Dragon is a 1984 British documentary television series directed by David Kennard. It covered life in China, with 12 one hour episodes, each on a different aspect of Chinese life. It was first aired in England on Channel 4, and in the United States by PBS. The 12-episode series won several international awards, including an Emmy.

Awards

References

External links 
 Heart of the Dragon at IMDb

1984 British television series debuts
1984 British television series endings
1980s British documentary television series
Channel 4 documentary series
English-language television shows